Carl Henry Hoeft (born 13 November 1974, in Auckland) is a former rugby union footballer from New Zealand, currently working as coach.

His usual position was at loosehead prop. He was a part of the New Zealand national rugby union team squad at both the 1999 and 2003 Rugby World Cups. Hoeft was known as a powerful scrummager.

He played club rugby for the Highlanders (rugby union) in New Zealand and for Castres Olympique and Toulouse in France.
After his retirement from rugby in late 2011 he became coach and entered the provincial side Waikato's staff as assistant for the scrum.

External links
 
 IRB 2003 profile
 ERC Rugby profile

1974 births
New Zealand rugby union players
New Zealand international rugby union players
New Zealand sportspeople of Cook Island descent
New Zealand people of Dutch descent
New Zealand people of German descent
New Zealand sportspeople of Samoan descent
New Zealand sportspeople of Tongan descent
Highlanders (rugby union) players
Rugby union props
Expatriate rugby union players in France
Living people
Rugby union players from Auckland